Running Man may refer to:

Literature
 The Running Man, a 1963 novel by Joan Carol Holly under the pseudonym J. Hunter Holly
 The Running Man (novel), a 1982 novel by Stephen King under the pseudonym Richard Bachman
 The Running Man (Bauer novel), by Michael Gerard Bauer
 "The Running Man" (short story), by Bill Pronzini
 Running Man, a musical by Cornelius Eady and Diedre Murray

Film and television
 The Running Man (1963 film), a British drama
 The Running Man (1981 film), a Canadian television film
 Running Man, working title for the Australian film released as The City's Edge (1983)
 The Running Man (1987 film), an American dystopian action film loosely based on the Stephen King novel
 Running Man (2013 film), a 2013 South Korean film
 Running Man (2015 film), a 2015 Chinese film
 Running Man (South Korean TV series), a South Korean variety show (since 2010)
Running Man (Philippine TV series), an upcoming spin-off of the South Korean variety show
 Running Man (Taiwanese TV series), a Taiwanese television series
 Keep Running (TV series), a Chinese variety show, previously called Running Man (2017) 
 "Running Man", a segment of the 1987 anime anthology film Neo Tokyo

Other uses
 Running man (dance)
 The Running Man (video game), a 1989 game based on the 1987 film
 Robert Garside (born 1967), the first person to run around the world, uses the alias "the Runningman"
 Barred lambda, a symbol used in phonetic notation
 The Running Man Nebula, a reflection nebula embedded in Sh2-279
 "Running Man", a song by Hanson on the album The Walk
 "Running Man", a song by Al Stewart on the album 24 Carrots
 A standard symbol used on an exit sign
 Another word for a "bagman" in organized crime
 The Glico man, a famous advertisement in Osaka, Japan
 The "Running Man" semigraphics characters from Apple's MouseText, Unicode points U+1FBB2 and U+1FBB3
 "Running Man" Mascot of  AIM

See also
 Man on the Run
 Fugitive
 Moonwalk (dance)